Tetraoctylammonium bromide (TOAB or TOABr) is a quaternary ammonium compound with the chemical formula: [CH3(CH2)7]4N Br.  It is generally used as a phase transfer catalyst between an aqueous solution and an organic solution.

References

Quaternary ammonium compounds